PRhyme is an American hip hop duo composed of Detroit-based rapper Royce da 5'9" and New York-based record producer DJ Premier. They created their own record label PRhyme Records and released their first album, PRhyme, on December 9, 2014, and its follow-up, PRhyme 2, on March 16, 2018. The production of each album is based on sampling a single artist's compositions: Adrian Younge for PRhyme and AntMan Wonder for PRhyme 2.  When the concept was originally pitched to Premier, he viewed it as a challenge since he recognized that he was previously known for his beats from obscure samples from many different sources, and this project forced him to find what he needed from a single catalogue of work.  For PRhyme 2, Royce described the process of receiving compositions to work off of directly from AntMan Wonder as being "like sampling from Mozart but Mozart is actually giving you the music". The duo also appeared on the Southpaw soundtrack. In 2021, DJ Premier confirmed PRhyme 3 is in the works.

Discography
Studio albums

References

Hip hop duos
DJ Premier 
American musical duos
American hip hop groups
African-American musical groups
Musical groups established in 2014
2014 establishments in the United States
Hip hop supergroups